The Creative Science Foundation (CSf) is a non-profit organization, established on 4 November 2011 in London,  England, that advocates a synergetic relationship between creative arts (e.g. writing, films, art, dance etc.) and sciences (e.g. engineering, business, socio-political etc.) as a means to fostering innovation.  It is best known for its use of science fiction prototyping as an ideation, communication and prototyping tool for product innovation. The foundation's main modus-operandi are the organisation or sponsorship of vacation-schools, workshops, seminars, conferences, journals, publications and projects.

See also
 Futures studies
 Micro-SFP
 Science Fiction Poetry Association
 Science fiction prototyping
 Science Fiction Research Association
 Threatcasting

References 

Non-profit organisations based in the United Kingdom
Scientific organisations based in the United Kingdom
Innovation organizations
Science fiction organizations